Thomas Martin (born June 4, 1978) is an American stock car racing driver. He currently competes part-time in the NASCAR K&N Pro Series West, driving the No. 11 Chevrolet SS owned by John Krebs.

Racing career
Martin's father was a Toyota mechanic. He owned mini stock cars. This triggered Martin's interest in racing. He made his racing debut at age 16 at the Grass Valley Speedway. His father served as his crew chief. He joined the Pro-Four West Coast Series in 1994 until 1998. In 1995 he was named rookie of the year and he in 1996 he won the championship. At Altamont Raceway Park, Martin holds the 1-lap qualifying record for the series.

He started racing late model cars in 1999, debuting at Madera Speedway. In 2003, Martin participated in the SRL Southwest Tour driving the No. 21 2002 Chevrolet Monte Carlo for Frederick W. Penney.

Martin made his K&N Pro Series West debut at Sonoma Raceway for the Carneros 200 in 2006. He finished 6th in the 2014 series. That year, he was awarded the Coca-Cola Move of the Year trophy.

Personal life
Martin is from Auburn, California. He attended Placer High School, where he played football.  He is a CNC machinist.

References

External links

Living people
1978 births
People from Auburn, California
NASCAR drivers
Racing drivers from California
Sportspeople from Greater Sacramento